Miranda, also known as X-4, is a British satellite in low Earth orbit. The satellite was launched in March 1974 as an engineering test bed of technologies in orbit.

Miranda was named after a character in the Shakespeare play The Tempest, just like Prospero (spacecraft) and Ariel 1.

Design

Operational
Miranda used propane cold gas thrusters for attitude control.

Sensors
It contained a Canopus star sensor to determine the reflectivity and interference caused by the propane.

Launch
Miranda was due to be launched by a British Black Arrow rocket, but due to the project's cancellation the payload was instead launched on the NASA-owned rocket Scout.

Mission
Designed as an engineering test bed for various technologies in orbit, Miranda carried various sensors and detectors.

Current status
The satellite is now non-active, but remains in low Earth orbit.

See also 

 1974 in spaceflight

Notes

References

Spacecraft launched in 1974
Satellites orbiting Earth
Science and technology in the United Kingdom
Space programme of the United Kingdom
Satellites of the United Kingdom